Carex shimidzensis is a tussock-forming species of perennial sedge in the family Cyperaceae. It is native to parts of Japan, Korea and the Kuril Islands.

The species was first formally described by the botanist Adrien René Franchet in 1895 as a part of the work Bulletin annuel de la Société Philomatique de Paris.

There are four synonyms;
 Carex nervulosa Franch. 
 Carex shimidzensis var. nervulosa (Franch.) Kük. 
 Carex sorachensis H.Lév. & Vaniot 
 Carex takeshimensis Nakai.

See also
List of Carex species

References

shimidzensis
Taxa named by Adrien René Franchet
Plants described in 1895
Flora of Japan
Flora of Korea
Flora of the Kuril Islands